DOS 8 or DOS-8 may refer to:

 DR-DOS 8.0, a version of DR-DOS distributed by DeviceLogics in 2004
 MS-DOS 8.0, the MS-DOS sub-system bundled in Microsoft Windows ME in 2000
 DOS-8 a.k.a. Mir-2, Russian spacecraft project of Salyut program in 2000
 Zvezda (ISS module), the final destination of the Russian DOS-8 module

See also
 86-DOS
 DOS (disambiguation)
 DOS 7 (disambiguation)
 DOS 10 (disambiguation)